Pierina Carcelén Jerí is a Peruvian actress, model and dancer.

Filmography

Teleseries

Theater

Reality shows

Movies

References
In Spanish:

Actresses from Lima
Peruvian female dancers
Peruvian film actresses
Peruvian female models
Living people
1979 births
21st-century Peruvian actresses
Peruvian stage actresses
Peruvian television actresses
Reality television participants